The Virgin is the title of the seventh solo album by British singer-songwriter Adrian Snell.

Track listing

Side one
 "Light of the World - Part 1" (Adrian Snell/Phil Thomson)
 "Love in My Life" (Adrian Snell/Phil Thomson)
 "The Promise"(Adrian Snell/Phil Thomson)
 "How Can I Explain" (Adrian Snell/Phil Thomson)
 "What a Love!" (Adrian Snell/Phil Thomson)
 "What do you Mean, a Baby?" (Adrian Snell/Phil Thomson)
 "All for Nothing" (Adrian Snell/Phil Thomson)
 "Joseph’s Dream" (Adrian Snell/Phil Thomson)

Side two
 "My Heart Sings" (Adrian Snell/Phil Thomson)
 "Journey to Bethlehem" (Adrian Snell/Phil Thomson)
 "Look at us Now" (Adrian Snell/Phil Thomson)
 "The Warning/Kill all the Children" (Adrian Snell/Phil Thomson)
 "Simeon’s Song/Son of the World" (Adrian Snell/Phil Thomson)
 "Light of the World - Part 2" (Adrian Snell/Phil Thomson)

Personnel
Adrian Snell: Vocals and Keyboards
Simon Phillips: Drums
Clive Bunker: Drums and Percussion
John G. Perry: Bass and Backing vocals
Phil Keaggy: Guitar
Dave Martin: Guitar
Dave Bainbridge: Guitar
Nick Pentelow: Saxophone
Booby Acock: Flute
John Lawry: Organ
Rod Edwards: Keyboards and Backing vocals
Shirley Roden: Vocals
Mo McCafferty: Vocals
Annie McCaig: Vocals
Paul Field: Vocals
Norman Barratt: Vocals
Gary Edwards: Vocals
Debi Deal: Backing vocals
Chris Snell: Vocals
Chris Driscoll: Vocals
Mark Sellwood: Vocals
Jon Miller: Vocals
Joe English: Vocals
Bonnie Bramlett: Vocals
John Pantry: Vocals
Geoff Turton: Vocals

Production notes
Produced by Jon Miller

References

1981 albums